Shangxiajiu Pedestrian Street, or simply as Shangxiajiu, is a commercial pedestrian street in Liwan District, Guangzhou, Guangdong, China. It is the first business street in Guangzhou, and it opened in September 1995.

Location

Shangxiajiu is composed of the unique and historical architecture based on Tong Lau and teahouses, featuring the characteristics of European and Chinese styles. It has a group of old famous stores, such as the Guangzhou Garment Store, the Herring Shoes and Hats Store, and the Dalu Clock and Watch Store. It also has some well-known restaurants, including the Guangzhou Restaurant (廣州酒家), the Taotaoju Restaurant (陶陶居), Wenchang Chicken (文昌雞), and Taotao Ginger and Onion Chicken (薑蔥雞).

See also
 List of tourist attractions in China

References

Buildings and structures completed in 1995
Buildings and structures in Guangzhou
Liwan District
Shopping districts and streets in China
Pedestrian malls in China
Tourist attractions in Guangzhou